The Lady of the Dugout is a 1918 American silent Western film directed by W.S. Van Dyke and starring Al J. Jennings, Frank Jennings and Corinne Grant.

Cast
 Al J. Jennings as Al Jennings 
 Frank Jennings as Frank Jennings
 Corinne Grant as The Lady
 Ben Alexander as The Lady's Son
 Joseph Singleton as The Lady's Husband
 Carl Stockdale as Zonie, The Killer

References

Bibliography
 Connelly, Robert B. The Silents: Silent Feature Films, 1910-36, Volume 40, Issue 2. December Press, 1998.

External links
 

1918 films
1918 Western (genre) films
1910s English-language films
American black-and-white films
Films directed by W. S. Van Dyke
Silent American Western (genre) films
1910s American films